Nuevitas Municipal Museum is a museum located in Nuevitas, Cuba. It was established on 18 August 1981.

The museum holds collections on history, weaponry, decorative arts and archeology.

See also 
 List of museums in Cuba

References 

Museums in Cuba
Museum
Buildings and structures in Camagüey Province
Museums established in 1981
1981 establishments in Cuba
20th-century architecture in Cuba